The Neutral Municipality (Portuguese: Município Neutro), more formally known in the imperial era as the Neutral Municipality of the Court ((Portuguese: Município Neutro da Corte), in reference to the Imperial Court,  was an administrative unit created in the Empire of Brazil, that existed in the territory corresponding to the current location of the municipality of Rio de Janeiro between August 12, 1834 (when it was proclaimed the Additional Act to the Constitution of 1824) and November 15, 1889, when was proclaimed the republic in Brazil. It only officially ceased to exist with the promulgation of the 1891 Constitution. Under the republican constitution, this administrative unit became the Federal District in 1891, which was abolished and transformed into the state of Guanabara in 1960, and later, with the fusion of this with the state of Rio de Janeiro in 1975.

History
After the transfer of the Portuguese Court to the city of Rio de Janeiro, the captaincy remained directly administered by the royal government, in a status differentiated from the others, whose administrations were slightly more autonomous in relation to the central power.

With the independence of Brazil, a greater administrative autonomy that was aspired by its elite could not be reached as in the other captaincies, now transformed into provinces, since the minister of the Kingdom, a position that was practically a substitute for the one of Viceroy, was entrusted with its Rio administration.

Allied to this was the fact that the city of Rio de Janeiro remained as the capital of the empire of Brazil, which caused the minister to administer the whole province by means of "warnings", which he directed to the Municipal chambers of cities which, at that time, were growing at a rapid pace due to the expansion and strengthening of coffee plantations in the Paraíba Valley, which already surpassed the strength of sugarcane plantations in the North Fluminense region.

These differences in relation to the other administrative units of Brazil meant that, in 1834, the city of Rio de Janeiro was included in the Neutral Municipality, which remained as the capital of the empire and directly administered by the imperial government, while the Rio de Janeiro had the same political-administrative organization of the others, having its capital in Vila Real da Praia Grande, which the following year was renamed Nictheroy (current Niterói).

The Neutral Municipality also had a Chamber elected by the local population and would take care of the life of that entity without interference from the provincial president or the Cabinet of Ministers, except for services that were subordinated to the national government. In 1889, after the implantation of the Republic in Brazil, the city of Rio de Janeiro continued as the capital of the country, and the Neutral Municipality becomes the Federal District after the proclamation of the Constitution of 1891.

With the change of the capital of the country to Brasília, the former Federal District, becomes the state of Guanabara. With the merger of the states of Guanabara and Rio de Janeiro in 1975, the city of Rio de Janeiro ceases to be understood in the state of Guanabara, fused with the state of Rio de Janeiro, returning to the state capital condition.

References

1889 disestablishments in Brazil
Former subdivisions of Brazil
Brazil
Types of administrative division
1834 establishments in Brazil